Mathieu Claude (born 17 March 1983 in Niort, Deux-Sèvres) is a French former professional road bicycle racer, who competed professionally between 2005 and 2012, entirely for the  squad which later became . He competed in the 2005 and 2010 Giro d'Italia and the 2006 and 2007 Vuelta a España.

Major results 

2003
 1st La Côte Picarde
 1st Paris–Tours Espoirs
2004
 1st Overall Tour d'Eure-et-Loir
 1st Stage 3 Boucles de la Mayenne
 6th Bordeaux–Saintes
2005
 6th Grand Prix d'Isbergues
2006
 7th Châteauroux Classic
 9th Nokere Koerse
2007
 6th Boucles de l'Aulne
2008
 9th Overall Tour Ivoirien de la Paix

External links 
 

1983 births
Living people
People from Niort
French male cyclists
Sportspeople from Deux-Sèvres
Cyclists from Nouvelle-Aquitaine